Kirkman Daniel Hodgson, JP (1814 – 11 September 1879) was an East India merchant and banker, becoming a partner in the merchantile firm of Baring Brothers and Co. He later became Deputy Governor and Governor of the Bank of England (1863–1865) and a Member of Parliament in the United Kingdom. He first stood in Bridport in 1857 to 1868 and later stood in the constituency of Bristol after winning a by-election in 1870 and retaining the seat in the 1874 General Elections. His resignation triggered the 1878 Bristol by-election.

Family
He was the son of John Hodgson, of The Elms, Hampstead. He attended Charterhouse School in 1826.  Hodgson married Frances Butler (1822–1851) in 1843 and the children to the marriage were Caroline Anna and Robert Kirkman.

Hodgson died at his residence of Ashgrove, Sevenoaks, Kent.

References

External links
 
 
 
 

1814 births
1879 deaths
People educated at Charterhouse School
Members of the Parliament of the United Kingdom for English constituencies
UK MPs 1857–1859
UK MPs 1859–1865
UK MPs 1865–1868
UK MPs 1868–1874
UK MPs 1874–1880
Governors of the Bank of England
Deputy Governors of the Bank of England
19th-century English businesspeople